Skyline Drive is a scenic roadway in Cañon City, Colorado. It was built by inmate labor in 1905. The road starts from U.S. Highway 50, with a gradual incline up the side of a ridge. When the road crests, it winds, climbs, and falls like a roller coaster until near its end, where a scenic outlook overlooks both the city (east) and the highway (west).

The road ends in a residential neighborhood, and becomes a residential street that intersects with 5th Street, where signs point south toward U.S. 50 and "Historic Downtown Cañon City," allowing drivers to head downtown and return to the highway.

Geology
The drive sits on the top of Skyline Ridge, a hogback composed of upturned Dakota sandstone. Outcrops of the Morrison and the Fountain formations can also be seen. Along the drive is the "Dinosasur trackway," a fenced-off area along the road adjacent to some exposed strata, which showcases the fossilized footprints of ankylosaurs walking towards the west.

References

External links

Streets in Colorado
Transportation in Fremont County, Colorado
Cañon City, Colorado